Temple elephants are a type of captive elephant. Many major temples own elephants; others hire or are donated elephants during the festive seasons. Temple elephants are usually wild animals, poached from the forests of North East India from wild herds at a young age and then sold into captivity to temples. Their treatment in captivity has been the subject of controversy and condemnation by some, while others claim that elephants form a vital part of the socio-economic framework of many temple ceremonies and festivals in India, particularly in the South.

The largest elephant stable in India is Punnathurkotta of the temple of Guruvayur; it has about 59 captive elephants; it currently houses 58 captive elephants, of which 53 are adult males and 5 are females.

Gallery on elephants

See also 
 Animal worship
 Guruvayur Keshavan
 Thrissur Pooram

References

External links

 Temple Elephants Video A short QuickTime video of Elephants from Tiruvannamalai, Sri Rangam and elsewhere.

Elephants
Elephants in Indian culture
Elephants in Hinduism
Domesticated animals
Livestock